Kazimierz Chodakowski (20 June 1929 – 21 October 2017) was a Polish ice hockey defenceman and Olympian. Chodakowski represented Poland at the 1952 Winter Olympics and 1956 Winter Olympics. He also played for ŁKS Łódź in the Polish Hockey League.

References

1929 births
2017 deaths
Ice hockey players at the 1952 Winter Olympics
Ice hockey players at the 1956 Winter Olympics
Olympic ice hockey players of Poland
Polish ice hockey defencemen
Sportspeople from Łódź